Pennsylvania Public Utility Commission (PUC) is the public utility commission in Pennsylvania.  It is composed of five commissioners, appointed by the Governor with the consent of the state Senate. The PUC oversees public utility and services operations in the commonwealth, in sectors including water, energy, telecommunications, and transportation.

State code requires separation of the five commissioners and an investigatory division.

History
The Pennsylvania Public Utility Commission has roots in the founding of the  Pennsylvania State Railroad Commission in 1907. The railroad commission was replaced in 1913 with the Pennsylvania Public Service Commission (PSC).  Act 43 of 1937 replaced the Public Service Commission with the Public Utility Commission, with a charter to oversee and regulate all public utilities doing business in the Commonwealth.

The PUC provided standards for metering of small alternative energy suppliers, such as solar and biodigesters, in June 2006. The standards lay out how  electric distribution companies (EDC) reimburse small suppliers to the grid.

The PUC oversees ordinances for Marcellus Shale gas exploration and extraction. The commission is responsible for collecting and distributing the Impact fee within the state.

In November 2014 the commission granted Uber with a two year experimental license to operate throughout the state.
  
An annual survey by the PUC in 2014 found more than 23,000 Pennsylvania households without heat.

In November 2018, the commission approved a new policy that clarified rules about how electric power is resold. The policy is part of an effort by the commission to promote investment in electric vehicle charging stations. Existing rules unintentionally limited public charging stations in the way that the electricity was priced and regulated.

See also
 List of Pennsylvania state agencies

References

External links
Pennsylvania Public Utility Commission

State agencies of Pennsylvania
Public utilities commissions of the United States